The Speech may refer to:

The Speech (fiction), trope among science fiction and fantasy
The Speech (Sharpley-Whiting book), 2009 book about Barack Obama
The Speech (Sanders book), 2011 book by Bernie Sanders
"A Time for Choosing", 1964 speech by Ronald Reagan 
"The Speech", a series 3 episode of the sitcom The IT Crowd
The Speech (Atatürk), a six-day speech by Mustafa Kemal Atatürk

See also
Speech (disambiguation)
List of speeches